Donji Proložac is a village in the municipality of Proložac, in inland Dalmatia, Croatia. The population is 1,511 (census 2011).

References

Populated places in Split-Dalmatia County